The table tennis department of Panathinaikos A.O. was founded in 1924 by the great player Nikos Mantzaroglou. Through the next decades Panathinaikos became one of the best table tennis teams in Greece with a lot of successes in both men and women.

In 1974, the men's team had its biggest success in the European competitions. In the ETTU Cup, Panathinaikos passed Turnerschaft Innsbruck, Centro Sportivo Milano, TTC Rot-Weiß Hamburg and reached the semi-finals, where they disqualified by Hertha BSC Berlin.

Honours
 Greek Clubs' Championship, Men (12): 
 1951, 1952, 1955, 1956, 1958, 1959, 1960, 1961, 1962, 1966, 1968, 1975
 Greek Clubs' Championship, Women (3): 
 1972, 1973, 1974
 Greek Cup, Men (3): 
 1965,1966, 1969
 Greek Cup, Women (2): 
 1972, 2022
  ETTU Cup, Men
 Semi-finals (1): 1974
  ETTU Europe Trophy, Women
 Winners (1): 2022

Current players
Season 2022–23

Former Notable players

Men

  Andrej Gaćina
  Jorge Campos
  Spyros Giannakopoulos
  Giannis Kalogiannis
  Nikos Kostopoulos
  Maria Louka
  Stamatina Louka
  Nikos Mantzaroglou
  Kostas Priftis
  Lena Ralli
  Eleni Vlachaki
  Jakub Dyjas
  Betty Janes Klosky

Women
  Katarzyna Grzybowska

Sources
 100 years Panathinaikos, Liveri, 2008
 Official website 

Panathinaikos A.O.
Table tennis in Greece
1924 establishments in Greece